Alex Ralph Smith (born 31 October 1991) is an English footballer who plays as a midfielder for Hastings United.

Club career
Smith, a product of the Fulham academy spent eleven seasons with Fulham and signed his first professional contract in 2009. Smith made his senior début for Fulham in a Premier League match against West Bromwich Albion at Craven Cottage, coming on as a substitute for Damien Duff at the end of the game during injury time. Fulham won the game 3–0.

On 22 November 2012, Fulham confirmed that Smith would be joining Leyton Orient until 2 January 2013. He made his Orient debut on 2 December in the FA Cup second round tie away to Alfreton Town.

Smith was loaned out again in March 2013, this time joining League One side Stevenage on a one-month loan deal.

Smith was one of twelve players released by Fulham at the end of the 2012–2013 Premier League season.

Smith signed for League One club Swindon Town on a one-year contract on 25 June 2013, with the option of a further year. Smith revealed he turned moves from Europe to join Swindon Town. Smith made his debut in the opening game of the season, playing as a left-back position, in a 1–0 loss against Peterborough United. However, Smith sustained an knee injury during a match against Queens Park Rangers in the second round of League Cup. After an operation, Smith would be likely to be out until Christmas. However, Manager Mark Cooper believes Smith doesn't expect for Smith to return until "well into the new year". After a six-month out, Smith finally made his return in 0–0 draw against Bristol City on 15 March 2014. Smith scored his first goal for the club in a 2–1 win over Tranmere Rovers on 25 March 2014. His goal against Tranmere Rovers was placed nine as the top ten best Swindon Town goal of 2013–14 season.

After a season with Swindon Town, Smith was among ten players to be released.

On 29 November 2014, Smith signed for League One side Yeovil Town on a month contract following a successful trial with the Glovers. Smith was released by Yeovil at the end of the 2014–15 season following their relegation to League Two.

On 14 January 2016, Smith joined National League side Woking on a six-month deal until the end of the season. On 26 January 2016, Smith made his Woking debut in a 3–1 defeat to Altrincham, replacing Bruno Andrade in the 68th minute. On 30 June 2016, Smith was released at the end of his contract.

In August 2016, Smith joined National League South side Eastbourne Borough.

On 19 May 2018, following a lengthy spell out on the sidelines, Smith returned to the game and joined Isthmian League side Hastings United.

Club statistics

References

External links

1991 births
English footballers
Fulham F.C. players
Leyton Orient F.C. players
Stevenage F.C. players
Swindon Town F.C. players
Yeovil Town F.C. players
Woking F.C. players
Eastbourne Borough F.C. players
Hastings United F.C. players
Living people
Footballers from Croydon
Premier League players
English Football League players
Association football midfielders